Puzzle Mountain is a twin-summit mountain on Vancouver Island, British Columbia, Canada, located  east of Gold River and  northwest of Mount Colonel Foster.

History
Puzzle Mountain is named for the maze of snow patches on its northeast face.

See also
 List of mountains in Canada

References

Vancouver Island Ranges
One-thousanders of British Columbia
Nootka Land District